is a Japanese footballer currently playing as a defender for FC Gifu.

Career statistics

Club
.

Notes

References

1999 births
Living people
Association football people from Osaka Prefecture
Hannan University alumni
Japanese footballers
Association football defenders
J3 League players
FC Gifu players